The Ulverton River is a tributary of the Saint-François River, flowing on the South Shore of the Saint-Laurent river, in the administrative region of Estrie, in Quebec, Canada.

The course of the Ulverton river crosses the territories of:
 the regional county municipality (MRC) of Le Val-Saint-François (administrative region of Estrie): Maricourt, Racine and Melbourne;
 the MRC of Drummond Regional County Municipality (administrative region of Centre-du-Québec): municipalities of Durham-Sud and Ulverton.

Geography 

The main neighboring hydrographic slopes of the Ulverton River are:
 north side: Saint-Germain River;
 east side: Saint-François River;
 south side: rivière au Saumon, Brandy stream, Fraser River;
 west side: rivière le Renne, Saint-Germain River, Yamaska River.

It constitutes the main hydrographic slope of the municipality of Ulverton.

The head of the river is located east of the head of the rivière le Renne, south of the Rivard stream, southwest of the village of Maricourt , east of route 222 and north of Valcourt.

Upper course of the river (segment of )

The Ulverton river first flows over:
  northerly, crossing the dividing line between Racine and Melbourne, south-east of the village of Maricourt, to Chemin d'Ely;
  towards the north, collecting the Bisaillon stream (coming from the southwest), up to the country road;
  north, collecting the Nelson stream, to a country road;

Lower course of the river (segment of )

From route 116, the Ulverton river flows over:
  west, winding the north side of route 116 and the railroad, and back into Durham-Sud, to a stream (coming from the west);
  north, to highway 55;
  northeasterly, to route 143;
  north, to its mouth.

Toponymy 
Formerly, this watercourse was also known as the “Black River”.

The toponym “Rivière Ulverton” was officially registered on December 5, 1968, at the Commission de toponymie du Québec.

See also
List of rivers of Quebec

References 

Rivers of Centre-du-Québec
Drummond Regional County Municipality
Le Val-Saint-François Regional County Municipality
Rivers of Estrie